The mixed Shuttle Hurdle Relay at the 2019 IAAF World Relays was held at the Nissan Stadium on 11 May.

Results

Heats
Qualification: The winner of each heat (Q) plus the 2 fastest times (q) advanced to the final.

Final

References

Shuttle Hurdle Relay

Shuttle hurdles relay
4 × 400 metres relay
Iaaf World Relays 2019